The Lithuania–Poland border is the state border between the Republic of Lithuania and the Republic of Poland. It runs from the Lithuania–Poland–Russia tripoint southeast to the Belarus–Lithuania–Poland tripoint. It is an internal border of the European Union and the Schengen Zone.

It is the only land border that one of the Baltic states (which are members of the EU and NATO) shares with a country that is not a member of the Commonwealth of Independent States.

History

In medieval times, the Kingdom of Poland and the Grand Duchy of Lithuania had a vast and often changing border. From the Union of Lublin (1569) to the Partitions of Poland, there was no Polish-Lithuanian border, as both countries were a part of a single federated entity, the Polish–Lithuanian Commonwealth. During the partitions of Poland era, there were borders between the Congress Poland (Augustów Voivodeship) and territory seized by the Russian Empire (Kovno Governorate and Vilna Governorate). A different border existed between the Second Polish Republic and Lithuania in the period of 1918–1939. Following the Polish–Lithuanian War, from 1922 onward it was stable and had a length of 521 km. Suwałki Agreement (1920) established the demarcation line through the Suwałki Region and for the most part it remains the border between Poland and Lithuania in modern times. The current border was established in the aftermath of World War II and it remained identical during the Soviet occupation of the Baltic states as well as after the restoration of the independence of Lithuania on 11 March 1990. On 5 March 1996, two countries signed a treaty on the common border, confirming its status and demarcation, as well as agreeing on the technical cooperation.

Lithuania and Poland joined the Schengen Area in 2007. This meant that all border checkpoints were removed along the border in December 2007, allowing unrestricted border crossing.

On 26 February 2023 Lithuanian customs reinstated third party cargo check points at the Lithuania–Poland border, due increased cargo freight from non-EU countries via Poland and Lithuania to Belarus.

Military significance

To the military planners of NATO, the border area is known as the Suwałki Gap (named after the nearby town of Suwałki) because it represents a military difficulty. It is a flat narrow piece of land, a gap, that is between Belarus and Russia's Kaliningrad exclave and that connects the three NATO-member Baltic States to Poland and the rest of NATO. In the event of a Russian attack, the Suwałki Gap would for Russia be important both for connecting Kaliningrad to the rest of Russia, and to prevent military assistance from the other NATO countries to reach the Baltic countries.

In July 2016, two years after the annexation of Crimea by the Russian Federation and the beginning of the War in Donbass, NATO's member states agreed at the 2016 Warsaw summit to what would become known as the NATO Enhanced Forward Presence.

A July 2017 NATO exercise was for the first time focused on defense of the gap from a possible Russian attack, and used troops and materiel from US, British, Polish, Lithuanian and Croatian sources.

In September 2017, Russia and Belarus produced the Zapad 2017 exercise.

Former border crossings

In the period 1991–2007, there were three road and one rail border crossing between Poland and Lithuania.

On 1 May 2004, when both Poland and Lithuania joined the European Union, this border became an internal border of the European Union. On 21 December 2007, Poland and Lithuania acceded to the Schengen Agreement. After this, crossing the border became easier, as EU internal borders are open to all traffic with little need for control. There are still, however, occasional customs and police controls against smuggling of restricted goods; these  affect only about 1% of travelers.

Road
 Budzisko–Kalvarija
 Ogrodniki–Lazdijai
 Berżniki–Kapčiamiestis

Rail
 Trakiszki–Šeštokai

Gallery

References

External links

 
 
 
 

1990 establishments in Lithuania
1990 establishments in Poland
1990 in international relations
European Union internal borders
Borders of Lithuania
Borders of Poland
International borders